Žabljak Airport (Montenegrin: Аеродром Жабљак / Aerodrom Žabljak) is an airport in the Žabljak Municipality in Montenegro. It is used for general aviation and cannot handle larger aircraft.

History 
At the end of 1955, JAT Yugoslav Airlines opened the Belgrade–Žabljak line with a Douglas DC-3 airliner.

See also 
de Havilland Canada DHC-6 Twin Otter

References 
  AERODROMI u PDF formatu
 
  – includes IATA codes
  – IATA and ICAO codes
  – IATA, ICAO and DAFIF codes

External links 
Žabljak Airport

Airports in Montenegro